Samuel Louis Kerber (born 26 July 1994) is an Australian cricketer. He made his List A debut on 28 March 2021, for South Australia in the 2020–21 Marsh One-Day Cup. He made his first-class debut on 3 April 2021, for South Australia in the 2020–21 Sheffield Shield season.

References

External links
 

1994 births
Living people
Australian cricketers
South Australia cricketers
Place of birth missing (living people)